Jack Power (born 1891) was an Irish hurler who played as a left wing-back for the Tipperary senior team.

Power made his first appearance for the team during the 1916 championship and was a regular member of the starting fifteen until his retirement after the 1925 championship. During that time he won two All-Ireland medals and four Munster medals.

At club level Power was a multiple county championship medalist with Boherlahan–Dualla.

His brother Paddy was also an All-Ireland medalist with Tipperary.

References

1891 births
Year of death missing
Boherlahan-Dualla hurlers
Tipperary inter-county hurlers
All-Ireland Senior Hurling Championship winners